And Once Again is a 2010 Indian drama film directed by Amol Palekar. The film stars Antara Mali, Rajat Kapoor and Rituparna Sengupta in lead roles. For the role of the monk, Antara Mali shaved her head.

Cast
 Antara Mali as Savitri
 Rajat Kapoor as Rishi
 Rituparna Sengupta as Manu

Critical reception
Sify rated the film 2.5 out of 5, criticising the story and pointing out "A film about loss, [like this one], succeeds only when it leaves the audience with a sense of loss and longing." Preeti Arora rated the film 2 out of 5. The Times of India rated the film 2.5 out of 5, stating as "And Once Again is a desire to make something different from the run-of-the-mill stuff." Tushar Joshi from Republik City News rated the film 1.5 out of 5.

Trivia
The characters Rishi and Manu played by Rajat Kapoor and Rituparna Sengupta respectively, are the names taken from another Bollywood actor Manu Rishi Chadha.

References

External links
 
 

2010 films
2010s Hindi-language films
2010 drama films
Indian drama films
Films directed by Amol Palekar
Hindi-language drama films